Public Media Works is a Delaware corporation headquartered in Van Nuys, California.  Founded in 2000 by actor Corbin Bernsen, the company engages in the development, production, marketing and distribution of "tailor made" entertainment for specifically targeted, fan-based audiences. This entertainment includes film and television, and may also include music, theater and sports.

Films
Carpool Guy, 2005 - a film targeted at soap opera fans and released on DVD.
Dead Air, 2008
The Wine of Summer, 2012

Articles
Public Media Works Executes Term Sheet for Purchase of Antibody Films, March 27, 2007

References

External links
Official web site

Companies based in Los Angeles County, California
Entertainment companies of the United States